Džanan Musa (born 8 May 1999) is a Bosnian professional basketball player for Real Madrid of the Spanish Liga ACB and the EuroLeague. He was selected by the Brooklyn Nets with the 29th pick in the 2018 NBA draft.

Early career
Born in Bihać, Bosnia and Herzegovina, Musa began playing soccer at first, before choosing to focus on basketball. Musa started playing junior basketball in the youth setup at KK Bosna XXL, when he was 8 years old. He then moved to Sarajevo-based KK Koš, before joining Croatian team KK Cedevita in 2014.

Professional career

Cedevita (2014–2018)
In December 2014, he signed a deal with Croatian team Cedevita. Musa made his debut in Europe's top-tier level competition, the EuroLeague, on 15 October 2015, making him the ninth-youngest player to make their debut in the EuroLeague. Musa played the first 4:55 minutes of the game and recorded 4 points.

In June 2017, Musa attended the Adidas Eurocamp, a basketball camp based in Treviso for international NBA draft prospects. He was named the Eurocamp 2017 Most Improved Player.

In the 2017–18 season, while a member of Cedevita, Musa was awarded the EuroCup Rising Star Trophy, after averaging 10.5 points and 3.2 rebounds per game, in 16 games played in Europe's 2nd-tier level EuroCup competition. He was also named the ABA League Top Prospect as well as to the All-ABA League Team for the 2017–18 season.

Brooklyn Nets (2018–2020)
On April 12, 2018, Musa declared for the 2018 NBA draft, where he was expected to be a first round selection. On June 21, he was selected with the 29th overall pick by the Brooklyn Nets. On July 12, the Nets signed Musa to a rookie scale contract. During his rookie season, Musa has had multiple assignments to the Long Island Nets of the NBA G League.

On November 19, 2020, Musa was traded to the Detroit Pistons in a three-team trade. On December 21, 2020, Musa was waived by the Pistons.

Anadolu Efes (2021)
On January 13, 2021, Musa signed a 2.5 year contract with Anadolu Efes of the Turkish Basketball Super League. On June 27, 2021, Efes used their option to exit from their mutual contract and Musa became a free agent. His short run with the Turkish club had four EuroLeague appearances and a short playing time total of 12 minutes. He also played in eight Turkish league games, averaging 11.4 points per game.

Río Breogán (2021–2022)
On July 21, 2021, Musa signed with Río Breogán of the Liga ACB. Musa became one of Río Breogán's most legendary players, by helping them sealing participation in the Copa del Rey de Baloncesto for the first time in more than 30 years. Musa's best moments in a Río Breogán jersey include two games against Valencia Basket, scoring 33 points (44 PIR) and 31 points (47 PIR), a game-winner against Breogán's arch-rivals Obradoiro CAB or his 25 points in Week 1 against CB Canarias. He got injured in April against Bàsquet Manresa. He won several Player of the Week awards and two Player of the Month awards, and is set to win his first Liga ACB MVP of the Season which would make him the first Río Breogán player to ever win the most prestigious individual award in Spanish basketball.

Real Madrid (2022–present)
On July 14, 2022, Musa signed a two-year deal with reigning Spanish champions and EuroLeague finalists Real Madrid.

National team career
Musa played at the 2014 FIBA Europe Under-16 Championship with the Bosnian national Under-16 team, leading the tournament in scoring, at 23.0 points per game. He also played at the 2015 FIBA Europe Under-16 Championship, which he led in scoring, at 23.3 points per game, and in assisting, at 6.3 assists per game. He also averaged 9.0 rebounds per game, during the tournament. In the tournament's finals game, against the tournament's hosts, Lithuania, Musa scored 33 points, to go along with his 8 rebounds, 7 assists, 3 steals and 2 blocks, leading his team to an 85–83 victory, and securing a gold medal for his team. Musa was named the MVP of the tournament, and he was also selected to the All-Tournament Team. 
Musa was named the MVP of the tournament, and he was also selected to the All-Tournament Team.

U17 World Cup scoring record 
Musa also played at the 2016 FIBA Under-17 World Cup, which he led in scoring and in efficiency, with 34.0 points per game, and 27.7 efficiency per game and 194.0 overall. He also averaged 8.1 rebounds and 3.0 assists per game. During the tournament, Musa made history by breaking the record in most points scored in a single competitive game with 50 points in a game against Chinese Taipei, previous being 41 points and shared by Isaac Humphries and Jalen Howard, who scored his on 23 June, just six days earlier of Musa. On 29 June, Musa managed to shoot 18-of-26 from the field and 11-of-15 from the free-throw line, adding 7 rebounds and 4 assists during 27 minutes and 15 seconds he spent on court. This is the current record for the most points scored in a single game at the FIBA Under-17 World Cup tournament.
He was selected to the All-Tournament Team.

Career statistics

NBA

Regular season

|-
| style="text-align:left;"|
| style="text-align:left;"|Brooklyn
| 9 || 0 || 4.3 || .409 || .100 || .000 || .6 || .2 || .2 || .0 || 2.1
|-
| style="text-align:left;"|
| style="text-align:left;"|Brooklyn
| 40 || 0 || 12.2 || .372 || .244 || .750 ||  2.2 || 1.1 || .4 || .0 || 4.8
|- class="sortbottom"
| style="text-align:center;" colspan="2"|Career
| 49 || 0 || 10.7 || .376 || .227 || .726 || 1.9 || .9 || .3 || .0 || 4.3

Playoffs

|-
| style="text-align:left;"|2019
| style="text-align:left;"|Brooklyn
| 2 || 0 || 7.5 || .667 || .000 ||  || .0 || .0 || 1.0 || .0 || 2.0
|-
| style="text-align:left;"|2020
| style="text-align:left;"|Brooklyn
| 3 || 0 || 13.0 || .182 || .000 || .714 || 1.0 || 1.3 || .0 || .3 || 4.7
|- class="sortbottom"
| style="text-align:center;" colspan="2"|Career
| 5 || 0 || 10.8 || .286 || .000 || .714 || .6 || .8 || .4 || .2 || 3.6

EuroLeague

|-
| style="text-align:left;"|2015–16
| style="text-align:left;"|Cedevita
| 10 || 2 || 7.4 || .438 || .250 || .667 || 1.3 || .7 || .2 || .1 || 2.7 || 1.6
|- class="sortbottom"
| style="text-align:center;" colspan=2|Career
| 10 || 2 || 7.4 || .438 || .250 || .667 || 1.3 || .7 || .2 || .1 || 2.7 || 1.6

ACB

Awards and accomplishments

Junior club level
 2017 Adidas Eurocamp Most Improved Player

Bosnian junior national team
 FIBA Europe Under-16 Championship champion: 2015
 FIBA Europe Under-16 Championship All-Tournament Team: 2015
 FIBA Europe Under-16 Championship Most Valuable Player: 2015
 2× FIBA Europe Under-16 Championship: Top scorer: 2014, 2015
 FIBA Under-17 World Championship All-Tournament Team: 2016

Professional club level
 ABA League Supercup winner: 2017
 ABA League Top Prospect: 2018
 All-ABA League Team: 2018
 EuroCup Basketball Rising Star: 2018

See also
 List of youngest EuroLeague players

References

External links

 Džanan Musa at DraftExpress.com
 
 Džanan Musa at EuroLeague
 
 Džanan Musa at FIBA Europe

1999 births
Living people
Anadolu Efes S.K. players
Bosnia and Herzegovina expatriate basketball people in the United States
Bosnia and Herzegovina men's basketball players
Bosniaks of Bosnia and Herzegovina
Bosnia and Herzegovina Muslims
Brooklyn Nets draft picks
Brooklyn Nets players
CB Breogán players
Bosnia and Herzegovina expatriate basketball people in Turkey
KK Cedevita players
Liga ACB players
Long Island Nets players
National Basketball Association players from Bosnia and Herzegovina
People from Bihać
Real Madrid Baloncesto players
Shooting guards
Small forwards
Bosnia and Herzegovina expatriate basketball people in Spain
Bosnia and Herzegovina expatriate basketball people in Croatia